Ria Schwendinger (born 25 September 1998) is a German ice dancer. With her skating partner, Valentin Wunderlich, she reached the final segment at three World Junior Championships and finished within the top ten in 2017 (Taipei) and 2018 (Sofia).

Skating career

Early years 
Schwendinger began skating as a three-year-old at EC Oberstdorf. She was coached by Rita Mensching before joining Karel Fajfr. She competed in novice ladies' singles until the end of the 2012–2013 season.

Partnership with Wunderlich 
In 2013, Schwendinger teamed up with Valentin Wunderlich to compete in ice dancing. Their ISU Junior Grand Prix debut came in 2014. During their third season together, they won their first German national junior title and were sent to the 2016 World Junior Championships in Debrecen, Hungary. Ranked 17th in the short dance, they qualified to the free dance and would move up to 16th overall.

Schwendinger/Wunderlich placed 13th in the short dance, 10th in the free dance, and 10th overall at the 2017 World Junior Championships in Taipei, Taiwan. Their result allowed Germany to send two ice dancing teams to the 2018 edition of the event. At the 2018 World Junior Championships, held in Sofia, Bulgaria, the duo again finished 10th, having placed 10th in both segments. Rostislav Sinicyn, Natalia Karamysheva, and Martin Skotnický coach them in Oberstdorf, Germany.

Programs 
(with Wunderlich)

Competitive highlights 
CS: Challenger Series; JGP: Junior Grand Prix

Ice dancing with Wunderlich

Ladies' singles

References

External links 
 

1998 births
German female ice dancers
Living people
People from Oberstdorf
Sportspeople from Swabia (Bavaria)
21st-century German women